San Zeno is a church and a former abbey in Pisa, Tuscany, Italy.

The church is documented going back to 1029. It was part of a monastery built over pre-existing edifices, and, until the 15th century, it had also a hospital. In the 12th century it was held by the Camaldolese monks.

The church has a nave and two aisles. The façade is preceded by a portico supported by pilasters and a central columns. The second row has mullioned windows and decorations with lozenges and small circular windows, with ceramic basins by Islamic masters (11th century; the originals are in the National Museum of San Matteo).

The interior has ancient Roman capitals and traces of medieval paintings.

Sources

Zeno
Romanesque architecture in Pisa
Monasteries in Tuscany
Benedictine monasteries in Italy
Camaldolese monasteries in Italy
Christian monasteries established in the 11th century
11th-century establishments in Italy
11th-century Roman Catholic church buildings in Italy